Cuando en el cielo pasen lista is a 1945 Argentine film directed by Carlos F. Borcosque.

Cast
 Narciso Ibáñez Menta
 Ilde Pirovano
 Aída Alberti
 Luis Zaballa
 Juan Carlos Barbieri
 Ricardo Passano
 José Olarra
 Raimundo Pastore
 Homero Cárpena
 Froilán Varela
 Percival Murray
 Zulma de Diego
 Antonio Sember
 Juan Carlos Altavista
 Saúl Jarlip
 Carlos Alberto Campos
 Carlos Belluci
 Julio Cobo
 Margarita Burke
 Ricardo Talesnik
 Enrique Chaico
 Carmen Giménez

References

External links
 

1945 films
1940s Spanish-language films
Argentine black-and-white films
Films directed by Carlos F. Borcosque
Argentine drama films
1945 drama films
1940s Argentine films